Those are the deputies that sit in the 15th Legislature of the Third Portuguese Republic. They were elected in the 2022 Portuguese legislative election, according to the Ministério da Administração Interna.

Aveiro District

Chega 
Jorge Valsassina Galveias

PPD/PSD 
António Milton Topa Gomes
Maria Paula da Graça Cardoso
Ricardo Bastos Sousa
Helga Correia
Rui Miguel Rocha da Cruz
Carla Madureira
Rui Filipe Vilar Gomes

PS 
Pedro Nuno Santos 
Cláudia Maria Cruz Santos 

Susana Alexandra Lopes Correia 

Joana Isabel Martins Rigueiro de Sá Pereira

Beja District

PCP-PEV

PS 

Nelson Domingos Brito

Braga District

Chega 
Filipe Melo

Iniciativa Liberal 
Rui Nuno de Oliveira Garcia da Rocha

PPD/PSD 

Firmino José Rodrigues Marques

Carlos Eduardo Vasconcelos Fernandes Ribeiro dos Reis
Jorge Paulo da Silva Oliveira
Maria Gabriela Fonseca
Bruno Manuel Pereira Coimbra
Carlos Manuel de Brito Cação

PS 

Elisabete Matos 

Palmira Maciel Fernandes da Costa 

Eduardo Salvador da Costa Oliveira
Anabela Pimenta de Lima de Deus Real

Bragança District

PPD/PSD

PS 

Berta Nunes

Castelo Branco District

PPD/PSD 
Cláudia André

PS 
Ana Abrunhosa
João Paulo Marçal Lopes Catarino

Coimbra District

PPD/PSD 
Mónica Quintela 
Maria de Fátima Simões Ramos do Vale Ferreira
João Paulo Lima Barbosa de Melo

PS 
Marta Temido

Tiago Estevão Martins

José Carlos Alexandrino Mendes
Ricardo Manuel Garrido Lino

Évora District

PPD/PSD 
Sónia Cristina Silva dos Ramos

PS 
Luís Capoulas Santos

Faro District

Chega 
Pedro Pinto

PPD/PSD 
Luís Filipe Soromenho Gomes
Rui Celestino dos Santos Cristina
Ofélia Ramos

PS 
Jamila Madeira

Isabel Cristina Andrez Guerreiro Bica

Guarda District

PPD/PSD 
Gustavo de Sousa Duarte

PS 
Ana Mendes Godinho
António Herminio Carvalho Monteirinho

Leiria District

Chega 
Gabriel Mithá Ribeiro

PPD/PSD 

Olga Silvestre

PS 

Eurico Jorge Nogueira Leite Brilhante Dias
Catarina Teresa Rola Sarmento e Castro 

Salvador Portugal Formiga

Lisbon District

Bloco de Esquerda 
Mariana Mortágua
Pedro Filipe Soares

Chega 
André Ventura
Rui Paulo Sousa
Rita Matias 
Pedro Pessanha

Iniciativa Liberal 
João Cotrim de Figueiredo

Rodrigo Miguel Dias Saraiva
Bernardo Alves Martinho Amaral Blanco

LIVRE 
Rui Tavares

PAN 
Inês Sousa Real

PCP-PEV 
Jerónimo de Sousa
Alma Rivera

PPD/PSD 
Ricardo Baptista Leite

Isabel Meirelles 
Joaquim José Miranda Sarmento

Lina Lopes 
Tiago da Mota Veiga Moreira de Sá
António Pedro Roque da Visitação Oliveira
Joana Catarina Barata Reis Lopes

António Manuel Pimenta Proa
Maria Emília Apolinário Sota Felicíssimo
Alexandre Bernardo de Macedo e Lopes Simões

PS 
António Costa
Edite Estrela
Mariana Vieira da Silva
José Duarte Piteira Rica Silvestre Cordeiro
Fernando Medina
Graça Fonseca

Sérgio Alexandrino Monteiro do Monte
Maria da Luz Rosinha 

João Saldanha de Azevedo Galamba
Susana Amador 
Sérgio Sousa Pinto
Ana Sofia Antunes

Maria de Fátima de Jesus Fonseca
Isabel Moreira

Romualda Fernandes
Miguel Cabrita

Portalegre District

PS 
Ricardo Miguel Furtado Pinheiro
Eduardo Miguel Oliveira Alves

Porto District

Bloco de Esquerda 
Catarina Martins
José Soeiro

Chega 
Rui Afonso
Diogo Pacheco de Amorim

Iniciativa Liberal 
Carlos Guimarães Pinto
Ana Patrícia Costa Gilvaz

PCP-PEV 
Diana Ferreira

PPD/PSD 
Sofia Matos 
Rui Rio
Paulo César Rios de Oliveira

Afonso Gonçalves da Silva Oliveira
Hugo Miguel Sousa Carneiro
Márcia Passos
Paulo Fernando de Sousa Ramalho
Rui Pedro Guimarães de Melo Carvalho Lopes
Maria Germana de Sousa Rocha
Paulo Miguel da Silva Santos
Joaquim José Pinto Moreira
Andreia Carina Machado da Silva Neto
Firmino Jorge Anjos Pereira

PS 
Alexandre Quintanilha
Maria do Rosário Gamboa Lopes de Carvalho 
João Pedro Matos Fernandes
Maria Isabel Solnado Porto Oneto 

Ana Paula Mata Bernardo
João Torres

Cristina Maria Mendes da Silva 
Eduardo Nuno Rodrigues e Pinheiro

Joana Ferreira Lima
Rui Carlos Morais Lage

Patrícia Monte Pinto Ribeiro Faro

Miguel dos Santos Rodrigues
Isabel Sofia Alves de Andrade

Santarém District

Chega 
Pedro Frazão

PPD/PSD 
Isaura Morais 
João Manuel Moura Rodrigues
Maria Inês Leiria Barroso

PS 
Alexandra Leitão

Maria do Céu Antunes
Mara Lúcia Lagriminha Coelho

Setúbal District

Bloco de Esquerda 
Joana Mortágua

Chega 
Bruno Nunes

Iniciativa Liberal 
Joana Rita Madaleno Cordeiro

PCP-PEV 
Paula Santos

PPD/PSD 

Fernando Negrão
Maria Fernanda Pardaleiro Velez

PS 
Ana Catarina Mendes
João Gomes Cravinho
Eurídice Maria de Sousa Pereira 
Jorge Filipe Teixeira Seguro Sanches
António Manuel Veiga dos Santos Mendonça Mendes
Maria Antónia Almeida Santos 
André Alexandre Pinotes Batista

Viana do Castelo District

PPD/PSD 

Emília Cerqueira
João Carlos Araújo Rêgo Montenegro

PS 
Tiago Brandão Rodrigues
Marina Sola Gonçalves
José Maria da Cunha Costa

Vila Real District

PPD/PSD 

Cláudia Bento

PS 

Fátima Liliana Fontes Correia Pinto
Agostinho Gonçalves Alves da Santa

Viseu District

PPD/PSD 

António Guilherme de Jesus Pais de Almeida
Cristiana Maria da Silva Ferreira
Hugo João Ribeiro Maravilha

PS 

João Paulo de Loureiro Rebelo

Madeira

PPD/PSD 
Sérgio Marques
Sara Martins Marques Santos Madruga da Costa
Patrícia Dantas

PS 

Marta Freitas (politician)

Azores

PPD/PSD 

Francisco José Duarte Pimentel

PS 

Sérgio Humberto Rocha de Ávila

Europe

PS 
Paulo Alexandre Carvalho Pisco
Natália Teixeira de Oliveira

Rest of the world

PPD/PSD 
António Alberto Maló de Abreu

PS 
Augusto Ernesto Santos Silva

References

Legislative
2022
Lists of current national legislators
Lists of Portuguese politicians